Kimichi School is a private secondary school specialising in music located in Acocks Green, Birmingham, England. The school was founded by Sally Alexander who was awarded an MBE for her Services to Education in HM The Queen's Birthday Honours 2021. 
The school occupies three buildings, the main house and two outdoor buildings.

Deputy Head, Chris Passey FCCT, was awarded Teacher of the Year at the 2022 Education Awards.

History
Kimichi School used to be Eastbourne House School until the latter closed in 2007. Eastbourne House School was founded in the 1930s and was originally located on the Warwick Road in Acocks Green. It later moved to 5 Dudley Park Road, Acocks Green, and moved to 111 Yardley Road in 1947. It was run by Frank Moynihan who originally bought the building in an auction intending to turn it into a primary school. He was headmaster of the school until his son Patrick, who was a pupil at the school, took over as headmaster himself.

Kimichi Symphony Orchestra was founded in 2017 and, under the baton of Keith Slade, has produced several concert events in Birmingham and Prague featuring complex repertoire and often with staged or danced elements.

Academics 
The school offers GCSEs and A-Levels. Currently the A-Levels on offer are: Music, English, Maths, Art, and Psychology.

References

External links
 Kimichi School official website

Music schools in England
Private schools in Birmingham, West Midlands
Educational institutions established in 2014
2014 establishments in England